Büşra Katipoğlu (born January 17, 1992) is a Turkish judoka competing in the -63 kg division. She is a member of İstanbul Büyükşehir Belediyesi S.K. She is a student of Bülent Ecevit University in Zonguldak.  She has qualified for the 2016 Olympics in the women's judo under 63 kg division.

She won the bronze medal at the 2015 IJF Grand Prix in Tashkent, Uzbekistan. At the 2015 IJF Grand Prix in Qingdao, China, she became silver medalist.
In 2016, she took the bronze medal at the Grand Slam in Baku, Azerbaijan.

References

External links
 
 

1992 births
Turkish female judoka
Living people
Istanbul Büyükşehir Belediyespor athletes
Judoka at the 2016 Summer Olympics
Olympic judoka of Turkey
Competitors at the 2018 Mediterranean Games
Mediterranean Games bronze medalists for Turkey
Mediterranean Games medalists in judo
20th-century Turkish sportswomen
21st-century Turkish sportswomen